The Copa Perú is a football tournament in Peru. Despite its name, it is not entirely an elimination-cup competition involving all Peruvian clubs, but rather a series of league tournaments leading to an elimination tournament, with regional league clubs as participants.  It guarantees its winner promotion to the professional Liga 2.

History

In 1966, the First Division was named Descentralizado; teams from outside the capital of Lima were allowed to participate in the professional first division. The following year, the Copa Perú began, in which all non-professional teams in Peru were allowed to compete, with the winner to gain promotion to the First Division.  After playing many elimination rounds, once six teams were left in the competition, they played in a final round-robin tournament in Lima.

In 1984, the First Division grew from 16 to 44 teams: after the first stage of the season, a Regional Championship qualified the teams for the Decentralizado, with 16 to 18 teams. The Copa Perú qualified teams for the Regional competition. Following this the tournament declined; 1987 was the last year in which a final was contested. The competitions was suspended as a result of the lack of interest and general economic crisis going on during President Alan García's first term. In 1992 the First Division returned to its normal format (16 teams).  In 1993 the Copa Perú was returned as a competition for the Second Division, but only for teams outside of Lima. Since 1993 there has also been a Second Division for teams competing that are based in Lima.

In 1998, a major change took place: eight teams from the regional stage qualified for the Finals stage. This was played as a traditional cup tournament with home and away legs being played. The winner gains promotion to the First Division. In 2004, the tournament widened to 16 teams, so that teams from Lima could also compete.  The winner and runner-up of the Second Division played in the Round of 16 of the Copa Peru. However, in 2006 this format was abolished as now the winner of the Second Division is promoted to the First Division. In 2008, the National Stage was modified. The four teams that qualified for the semi-finals played in a final group stage; the top two were promoted to the First Division.

In 2009, the Peruvian Football Federation officialized the creation of the Ligas Superiores del Peru. The Ligas Superiores will group to a select group of clubs of each department, that will be faced only among itself and will throw a champion and a runner-up that will agree directly, for now, to play a home run against the clubs that remain first and second in the Departmental Stage. For 2009, nine Departmental Confederacies had adopted them: Arequipa, Ayacucho, Cajamarca, Huánuco, Lambayeque, Pasco, Piura, Puno and Tumbes.

On August 23, 2022, it was announced that from 2023, the Copa Perú would only give promotion to Liga 2 due to the reforms of Peruvian football by the FPF.

Format

The tournament has 5 stages. The first stage of the tournament is the District Stage, played from February to May. Districts hold a small league tournament to determine its winners which will qualify for the next stage. The second stage is the Provincial Stage, played in June and July. The District winners play in groups and the winners qualify for the next stage. The third stage is the Departmental Stage, consisting of another league tournament, between July and September.

Starting in 2015 under the leadership of the new Peruvian Football Federation president Edwin Oviedo, all the Regions of Peru are represented in the National Stage, which is played under Regional using the POT System, intellectual property of MatchVision company. The new National Stage starts in the first week of September.

This new phase features the 50 teams that qualified from the Departmental Stage. Each team plays 3 games at home and 3 games away, for a total of 6 games against 3 different geographical rivals. The departmental stage winners only play against departmental runners-up, and vice versa. All the teams are positioned in one general table. After 6 matches, the team in places 1 to 8 are qualified directly to the Round of 16, while the teams in places 9 to 24 will play the Repechage phase. The teams in places 25 to 50 are eliminated.

The teams play a bracket tournament up to the Semi-finals. All four teams qualified to the semi-finals play a final group stage known as La Finalísima in Lima. The winner of the final group stage   and the runner-up of the final group stage will be promoted to the Liga 2.

Division levels

Champions

Footnotes

A. In this year the tournament ended at the Regional Stage. The 8 regional champions were directly promoted to 1974 Torneo Descentralizado - which augmented from 18 to 22 teams - and no Final took place. These teams were Alfonso Ugarte, Barrio Frigorífico, Carlos A. Mannucci, Deportivo Junín, Piérola, Unión Huaral, Unión Pesquero and Walter Ormeño.
B. From 1988 to 1992, no Final tournaments were held. Regional champions entered the Peruvian Primera División’s Regional tournaments.
C. No third-place awarded due to tournament format.

Titles by club

Titles by region

References

External links
  Peru FA 
  RSSSF

 
3
Peru